James Jardine may refer to:

 James Jardine (engineer) (1776–1858), Scottish civil engineer, mathematician and geologist
 James Jardine (cricketer, born 1794) (1794–1872), English cricketer
 James Jardine (judge) (1846–1909), English cricketer, academic, barrister and judge
 James Jardine (Medal of Honor) (1837–1922), Union Army soldier and Medal of Honor recipient
 James Bruce Jardine (1870–1955), British soldier and diplomat
 James Willoughby Jardine (1879–1945), British judge and  politician